Samuel Johannesen Balto (May 5, 1861 – 1921) was a Northern Saami explorer and adventurer. Balto skied with Fridtjof Nansen across Greenland in 1888–89.

Biography
Samuel Johannesen Balto was born in Karasjok in Finnmark county, Norway. He had worked as a lumberjack, as well as in reindeer herding and fishing. In 1888, Balto was recruited by Fridtjof Nansen for Nansen's Trans-Greenland Expedition. Balto participated in the first recorded crossing of the interior of Greenland, together with Nansen and four other expedition members.  Balto wrote his own book after the expedition: Med Nansen over Grønlandsisen i 1888 – Min reise fra Sameland til Grønland.

In 1898, Balto moved to Alaska and signed a  two-year contract as a reindeer herder. In 1900, he led a large group of Sámi hired as reindeer herdsmen during the Lapland-Yukon Relief Expedition later known as the Manitoba Expedition. Samuel Balto, together with 113 other people from Finnmark were hired by  Sheldon Jackson to be involved in the introduction of reindeer in Alaska. Jackson promoted a plan to import reindeer from Russia to introduce reindeer husbandry to the Inupiaq as a solution to their loss of subsistence resources. The group was responsible for transporting goods and mail from Nome, Alaska, to gold mining workers up the Yukon River valley in the central parts of Alaska.  Eventually Samuel Balto  became a gold miner at Nome, Alaska, during the Klondike Gold Rush. Balto staked three claims at a site which became known as Balto Creek.

Samuel Johannesen Balto died in 1921 in Karasjok. Balto, the Alaskan sled dog made famous during the 1925 serum run to Nome, which transported diphtheria medication across the U.S. territory of Alaska to combat an epidemic, was named in memory of Samuel Balto.

See also
Balto (dog), namesake
Jason (Ship)

References

Other sources
Jackson, Sheldon  Alaska and Missions on the north Pacific Coast (New York: Dodd, Mead & Company. 1880)
Nansen, Fridtjof (tr. H.M. Gepp)  The First Crossing of Greenland (London: Longmans, Green and Co. 1890)
Salisbury, Gay; Laney Salisbury  The Cruelest Miles: The Heroic Story of Dogs and Men in a Race against an Epidemic (New York: W.W. Norton & Company. 2003)  .

External links
 Samuel Johannesen Balto (Fram Museum)
 Image of Samuel Balto

Norwegian polar explorers
Norwegian Sámi people
1861 births
1921 deaths
People from Karasjok
People of the Klondike Gold Rush
Sámi-American history
Norwegian Sámi-language writers
People from Nome, Alaska
Fridtjof Nansen